Đuro "George" Mihaljević (born 28 February 1936) is a Croatian-American former football player and coach.

Career
Mihaljević began his career with the youth team of Radnički in 1948. Between the ages of 18 and 22 he played professionally in Austria, Germany and Switzerland, before moving to the United States, where he joined the Army. After retiring as a player, he became the first ever coach of the St. Louis Stars during the 1967 season.

Personal life
Mihaljević has five children. His eldest son Joe Mihaljević was also a professional footballer, and currently runs the Mihaljevic Soccer School, now in Folsom, California, a soccer school which his father founded in St. Louis, Missouri.

References

External links
Mihaljevic Soccer School

1936 births
Living people
Yugoslav emigrants to the United States
Association footballers not categorized by position
Yugoslav footballers
American soccer players
FK Radnički Beograd players
Yugoslav First League players
Yugoslav expatriate footballers
Expatriate soccer players in the United States
Yugoslav expatriate sportspeople in the United States
Yugoslav football managers
American soccer coaches
North American Soccer League (1968–1984) coaches
Expatriate soccer managers in the United States